The Monobob competition at the IBSF World Championships 2021 was held on 13 and 14 February 2021. This was the introduction of the Women's Monobob event to the World Championships.

Results
The first two runs were started on 13 February at 09:00 and the last two runs on 14 February at 09:00.

References

Monobob